A list of notable people from Alappuzha:

Academia and science
 Tessy Thomas - DRDO
 Itty Achudan - the major contributor of ethno-medical information for the compilation of Hortus Malabaricus
 Illiparambil Corah Chacko - geologist
 Pallithanam Luca Matthai - pioneer of kayal cultivation in Kuttanad, and former member of Sree Moolam Popular Assembly

Arts and entertainment

Film and stage
 K. Madhu - film director, film producer, actor
 Saranya Ponvannan - actor
 Parvathy Jayaram - actor
 Mammootty - actor
 Navodaya Appachan (Chacko Punnoose) - film producer, director, and entrepreneur
 Ashokan - Malayalam film actor, 1978–
 Thoppil Bhasi - playwright, screenwriter, and film director
 Kunchako Boban - film actor
 Riaz M T - Film Actor
 Rajan P. Dev - Malayalam film actor 
 Fazil - film director
 Fahad Fazil - film actor
 Chelangatt Gopalakrishnan - film critic and writer
 Kunchacko - film producer and director 
 K. P. A. C. Lalitha - film actress
 Balachandra Menon - film actor, director, script writer
 Navya Nair - film actress in Malayalam, Tamil, and Kannada films
 Padmarajan - film director, script writer, story writer
 Chenganoor Raman Pillai - stage actor
 Muthukulam Raghavan Pillai - dramatist, film actor, poet
 Narendra Prasad -  actor, playwright, and director
 Priyadarshan - film director
 Ratheesh - film actor
 M. G. Sreekumar - playback singer and film music director
 Sreekumaran Thampi - lyricist, director, producer, script writer
 Vayalar Sarath Chandra Varma - film lyricist
 Nedumudi Venu - film actor
 Vinayan - film director
 Saranya Mohan - film actor

Graphic arts
 K. Shankar Pillai - cartoonist (Shankar)

Literature
 Eleanour Sinclair Rohde - British gardener and writer on gardening
 Joy J. Kaimaparamban - English and Malayalam author
 Ayyappa Paniker - poet
 Kavalam Narayana Panicker - poet
 Parappurath (K. E. Mathai) - novelist and short story writer
 Thakazhi Sivasankara Pillai - novelist and short story writer
 Vayalar Ramavarma- Malayalam poet and film lyricist
 K. P. Sasidharan- Malayalam writer and academician
 Lopamudra R - Malayalam Poet and Translator

Music
 Mavelikkara Velukkutty Nair - mridangam player
 Palani Subramaniam Pillai -  percussionist, played the mridangam and kanjira
 Erickavu N. Sunil - mridangam player
 Mavelikkara Prabhakara Varma - Carnatic singer

Commerce and business
 Bhima Bhattar - founder of Bhima Jewellers at Mullakkal, Alleppey

Judiciary 
Justice CT Ravikumar,Judge Supreme Court of India

Politics, government, and social welfare 
 V. S. Achuthanandan - former Chief Minister and current leader of opposition of Kerala
 K. R. Gowri Amma - Revenue Minister in the first Kerala LDF ministry, initiated the revolutionary land reforms in Kerala, Agriculture Minister in Kerala UDF Ministry
 A. K. Antony - Three-time Chief Minister of Kerala, Former Indian Defence Minister
 Ramesh Chennithala - politician, former Member of Parliament
 T. K. Madhavan (1885—1930) social reformer, journalist and revolutionary
 Pallithanam Luca Matthai - Former member of Sree Moolam Popular Assembly and pioneer of kayal cultivation in Kuttanad
 Kavalam Madhava Panikkar - diplomat, administrator, historian
 P. Parameswaran - director of Bharathiya Vichara Kendram and president of Vivekananda Kendram
 Vayalar Ravi - former Home minister of Kerala, Union Cabinet Minister of Overseas Indian Affairs and Minister for Parliamentary Affairs
 C. M. Stephen - politician and Union minister

Religion
 Baselios Thoma Didymos I - Catholicos of the East and Malankara Metropolitan
 Kuriakose Elias Chavara - Blessed, co-founder of CMI
 James Kalacherry - Bishop of Changanacherry, who campaigned against the move by C. P. Ramaswami Iyer, the Diwan of Travancore in 1945, to nationalise all schools 
 Navajyothi Sree Karunakara, the founder of Santhigiri Ashram
 Mar Thomas Kurialachery - Venerable, first bishop of what would become the Archdiocese of Changanassery, and founder of the Sisters of the Adoration of the Blessed Sacrament

References 

 
Lists of people by city in India
Lists of people from Kerala